The 11005 / 11006 Dadar Terminus–Puducherry Chalukya Express is an express train of the Indian Railways connecting  in Puducherry and Dadar Terminus of Mumbai, Maharashtra. It is currently being operated with 11005 / 11006 train numbers on daily basis.

History 

This train gets its name from the Chalukya dynasty that ruled the Karnataka region. Remaining 3 days, it runs as train, Dadar Central–Tirunelveli Chalukya Express with train no. 11021/11022.

Route & Halts 

  
 
 
 
 
 
Maharashtra - Karnataka State Border
 
 
 
 
 
 
 
Karnataka - Tamil Nadu State Border
 
 
 
Tamil Nadu State - Puducherry UT Border

Traction

Direction reversal

The train reverses its direction 2 times:

Timing 

11005 – Leaves Dadar, (Mumbai) at 21:30 Hrs IST on Sunday, Monday, Friday and reaches Puducherry railway station on Tuesday, Wednesday, Sunday at morning 7:17 AM IST.

11006 – Leaves Puducherry railway station every Tuesday, Wednesday, Sunday at 20:50 Hrs and reaches Dadar on Thursday, Friday, Tuesday at 5:40 AM IST.

Coach composition

 1 AC II Tier
 3 AC III Tier
 9 Sleeper Coaches
 3 General

See also

 Chalukya Express
 Lokmanya Tilak Terminus–Ernakulam Duronto Express
 Mumbai–Nagercoil Express

Notes

References

External links 

 11005/Chalukya Express
 11006/Chalukya Express

Express trains in India
Rail transport in Maharashtra
Rail transport in Karnataka
Rail transport in Tamil Nadu
Rail transport in Puducherry
Transport in Puducherry
Transport in Mumbai
Railway services introduced in 2012